Ernest W. Jones ( – death unknown) was an English professional rugby league footballer who played in the 1910s and 1920s.

Playing career

International honours
Jones won caps for England while at Rochdale Hornets in 1913 against Wales, in 1914 against Wales, and he won caps for Great Britain while at Rochdale Hornets in 1920 on the 1920 Great Britain Lions tour against Australia, and New Zealand (3 matches).

County Cup Final appearances
Ernest Jones played  and scored a try in Rochdale Hornets' 12–5 victory over Oldham in the 1911–12 Lancashire County Cup Final during the 1911–12 season at Wheater's Field, Broughton, Salford on Saturday 2 December 1911, in front of a crowd of 20,000.

Club career
Through injury, Jones did not appear in Rochdale Hornets' 10–9 victory over Hull F.C. in the 1921–22 Challenge Cup Final during the 1921–22 season at Headingley Rugby Stadium, Leeds on Saturday 6 May 1922, Rochdale Hornets had a medal especially struck for him.

References

External links

England national rugby league team players
English rugby league players
Great Britain national rugby league team players
Place of birth missing
Place of death missing
Rochdale Hornets players
Rugby league five-eighths
Rugby league halfbacks
Rugby league players from Somerset
Year of birth missing
Year of death missing